Jianguo Road is a major road in eastern Beijing. It forms part of the extended Chang'an Avenue.

It runs from the Dabeiyao crossing (Guomao Bridge) in the west to the start of the Jingtong Expressway in the east, although it also acts as an auxiliary road to the expressway.

It also runs through the heartland of the Beijing CBD. The Soho New Town building complex is alongside Jianguo Road.

The Jianguo Road as an auxiliary road to the Jingtong Expressway runs into Tongzhou District.

Line 1 of the Beijing subway runs along the route until Sihui East; the Batong Line runs as of the Sihui station.

Road transport in Beijing